Charles Wellington Furlong (1874–1967) was an American explorer, writer, artist and photographer from Massachusetts.

Life 

Furlong was born in Cambridge, Massachusetts in 1874. He graduated from  Massachusetts Normal Art School in 1895. From 1901-1902, he was a student at Cornell, Harvard, Ecole des Beaux Arts, Paris.  He was the head of the Art Department  at Cornell from 1896-1904.

He was in North Africa, 1904-1905; Tierra del Fuego, 1907-1908; and Venezuela, 1910. In 1915 he was a member of an expedition to the West African islands for the Harvard Museum of Comparative Zoology (the Kitty A expedition).

He was the first American to explore the Tripolitan Sahara.  This experience led to his writing of The Gateway to the Sahara in 1909.  Harper's magazine funded him on a trip to South America around 1909.  His article “The Southernmost people of the world” came out of this trip.  Even after the article was written he continued to travel and explore in South America.
 
His world travels led to a decline in his overall health, in order to get better he traveled to the American West as Theodore Roosevelt had done for his health earlier.

In 1914, he became a member of the U.S. Army until the end of World War I in 1918.  After the war, he was a Member of the American Peace delegation in Paris, France  for a year.  Then in 1919 he was appointed as the Special Military aide to President Woodrow Wilson for a brief time before he was reappointed as a Military observer, intelligence officer in the Balkans, Near East and Middle East. His association with the U.S. military was not a brief affair.  He served as a Reserve officer for 34 years, attaining the rank of colonel.  His knowledge of the Middle East was valuable during World War II.

In 1925, he helped establish a voting system in Tacona, Africa, personally designing ballots and setting up polling places in remote areas.
While traveling the world he continued to write and create a variety of types and kinds of art, along with his work as a diplomat and military delegate.

He died in 1967, leaving behind two children.

Works

Books

 Tripoli in Barbary(1911)
 The vanishing people of the Land of Fire
  The southernmost people of the world

Articles

• -- (August, 1918) "Climbing the Shoulders of Atlas," Harper's Monthly Magazine 819 (1918): 420-434.

Artworks 

http://americanart.si.edu/search/search_artworks1.cfm?StartRow=1&ConID=1704&format=short

References

External links 

 Ask Art Biography
 The Papers of Charles W. Furlong at Dartmouth College Library

1967 deaths
1874 births
American male writers
Writers from Cambridge, Massachusetts
Cornell University alumni
Harvard University alumni
American alumni of the École des Beaux-Arts
Artists from Cambridge, Massachusetts